The men's 3000 metres steeplechase event at the 2007 Summer Universiade was held on 11–13 August.

Medalists

Results

Heats
Qualification: First 4 of each heat (Q) and the next 4 fastest (q) qualified for the final.

Final

References
Results

3000
2007